San Martín de Hidalgo Municipality is a municipality located in the Región Valles of the state of Jalisco, Mexico. As of 2010, the population was 26,306. The municipal seat is San Martín de Hidalgo. Other administrative communities include 5 delegations and 18 agencies.

History
The municipal council was established in 1823.

Geography
The municipality is situated in the Valley of Ameca and the Sierra de Quila, of the Mexican state of Jalisco. In the 2010 census, its population totaled 24,127 inhabitants. The municipal seat is San Martín de Hidalgo, and its boroughs are El Crucero de Santa María, El Salitre, El Tepehuaje de Morelos, Buenavista de Cañedo, and Santa Cruz de las Flores. The municipality covers an area of 324.57 km². As of 2010, the municipality had a total population of 26,306.

Bordering the adjacent municipalities of Teuchitlán on the north, Ameca on the west, Tecolotlán on the south and Cocula on the east.

In territorial means, the municipality is divided into six regional subcommittees all chaired by the municipal seat, they are El Crucero de Santa María, El Salitre, El Tepehuaje de Morelos, Buenavista de Cañedo, and Santa Cruz de las Flores.  Each of these Municipal Delegations serve as the regional seats for other smaller communities called Municipal Agencies.

Communities and populations

Government

Municipal presidents

References

External links
 http://sanmartinhidalgo.info

Municipalities of Jalisco